Brandon Wood (born 1985) is a former American baseball player.

Brandon Wood or Brandon Woods may also refer to:

People
 Brandon Wood (basketball) (born 1989), American basketball player
 Brandon Woods, Australian musician

Other uses
 Brandon Wood, woodland south of Binley Woods, Warwickshire, England